Howard Hubert Ménard (born April 28, 1942) is a Canadian former professional ice hockey player who played 151 games in the National Hockey League. He played for the Detroit Red Wings, Los Angeles Kings, Chicago Black Hawks and the Oakland Seals between 1964 and 1970. Most of his career, which lasted from 1962 to 1977, was spent in the minor American Hockey League (AHL). Howie is the brother of Hillary Menard.

Howie continues to hold the record for most points in a playoff game (7) in the AHL Calder Cup, with four goals and three assists against the Cleveland Barons on April 12, 1972, while playing for the Baltimore Clippers. Only two players have tied his record since that time.

Howie was the Captain of the 1961-62 Memorial Cup Champions, Hamilton Red Wings.

Career statistics

Regular season and playoffs

References 

1942 births
Living people
Baltimore Clippers players
Canadian expatriate ice hockey players in the United States
Canadian ice hockey centres
Chicago Blackhawks players
Cincinnati Wings players
Detroit Red Wings players
Franco-Ontarian people
Los Angeles Kings players
Memphis Wings players
Oakland Seals players
Sportspeople from Timmins
Pittsburgh Hornets players
Providence Reds players
Salt Lake Golden Eagles (WHL) players
Springfield Indians players
Springfield Kings players
Toronto Marlboros players